Fridolin Schley (born 29 October 1976) is a German writer. In 2007 he won the Toucan Prize for his novel Wildes schönes Tier, and in 2021 again for Die Verteidigung.

Life 
Fridolin Schley was born in Munich on 29 October 1976. He went to school in Gauting and then studied German studies, philosophy and political science in Munich and Berlin, followed by a course of studies at the University of Television and Film Munich. He received his PhD for his works on W. G. Sebald. In 2007 he was invited to the Festival of German-Language Literature to read from his novella Unannehmlichkeiten durch Liebe. He is a member of the German section of PEN International and works as a freelancer for Die Zeit. He lives in Munich.

Reception 
The FAZ attests his debut novel Verloren, mein Vater "literary finesse" and "bravery"; he impressed with his dealing with social topics.

Awards 
 2001: Hermann-Lenz-Preis studentship for Verloren, mein Vater
 2001: Bayerischer Kunstförderpreis for Verloren, mein Vater
 2007: Toucan Prize for Wildes Schönes Tier
 2021: Toucan Prize for Die Verteidigung
 2022: Franz-Hessel-Preis for Die Verteidigung

Bibliography

Fiction 
 2001: 
 2003: 
 2007: 
 2016: 
 2021:

Non-fiction 
 2012: 
 2014:

References

External links 
 Personal website

1976 births
21st-century German writers
German male writers
Living people
Writers from Munich